Gunaratna Chintaka de Zoysa (born 18 December 1971) is a former Sri Lankan sprinter who competed in the men's 100m competition at the 1996 Summer Olympics. He recorded a 10.55, not enough to qualify for the next round past the heats. His personal best is 10.29, set in 1999.

References

External links
 

1971 births
Sri Lankan male sprinters
Athletes (track and field) at the 1996 Summer Olympics
Athletes (track and field) at the 1998 Asian Games
Olympic athletes of Sri Lanka
Living people
Asian Games competitors for Sri Lanka
20th-century Sri Lankan people
21st-century Sri Lankan people